Valentin Bărbulescu (born 28 December 1985) is a Romanian professional footballer who plays as a midfielder for Liga II side CSA Steaua București.

Honours
CSA Steaua București
Liga III: 2020–21
Liga IV: 2019–20

References

External links

 
 

1985 births
Living people
Footballers from Bucharest
Romanian footballers
Association football midfielders
Liga I players
Liga II players
CS Concordia Chiajna players
FC Petrolul Ploiești players
SCM Râmnicu Vâlcea players
AFC Săgeata Năvodari players
CS Sportul Snagov players
ASC Daco-Getica București players
CSM Reșița players
CSA Steaua București footballers